Jayakrishna was an Indian film producer known for his works in Telugu cinema and few Tamil films. He produced films such as Mana Voori Pandavulu 1978, which won the Filmfare Award for Best Film – Telugu for that year. His other hits include, Manthri Gari Viyyankudu 1983, Vivaha Bhojanambu, Muddula Manavaralu, Seetaramulu, Raagaleela, Neeku Naaku Pellanta, Krishnarjunulu, 420 etc. He produced the Tamil film Aalavandhan.

Career 
He started his career as a makeup man in the film industry. He was a personal makeup man for Telugu actors Krishnam Raju and Vijayashanti. The noted film producer A.M. Rathnam was his student who later on became a makeup man and then a producer. He is the first producer to pay a remuneration to Chiranjeevi (Rs. 1116/-). His production banners include Muddu Art Movies, Jayakrishna Movies.

Filmography 
Telugu
Krishnaveni (1974)
Bhakta Kannappa (1976)
Amara Deepam (1977)
Mana Voori Pandavulu (1978)
Sita Ramulu (1980)
Krishnarjunulu (1982)
Mantri Gari Viyyankudu (1983)
Seethamma Pelli (1984)
Muddula Manavaralu (1985)
Sravanthi (1985)
Jackie (1985)
Vivaha Bandham (1986)
Mister Bharat (1986)
Raga Leela (1987)
Vivaha Bhojanambu (1988)
Neekoo Naakoo Pellanta (1988)
420 (1992)
Dasu (2001)

Tamil
Aalavandhan (2001)

Awards 
1978 – Filmfare Award for Best Film – Telugu – Mana Voori Pandavulu

References 

Filmfare Awards South winners
Telugu film producers
Tamil film producers
2016 deaths
Year of birth missing
Film producers from Hyderabad, India